Thoralf Peters (born 13 January 1968 in Güstrow) is a German rower.

References 
 
 

1968 births
Living people
People from Güstrow
Rowers at the 1992 Summer Olympics
Olympic silver medalists for Germany
Olympic rowers of Germany
Olympic medalists in rowing
German male rowers
Medalists at the 1992 Summer Olympics
Sportspeople from Mecklenburg-Western Pomerania